Romerella is a genus of harvestmen in the family Sclerosomatidae from Mexico and South America.

Species
 Romerella bicolor C.J.Goodnight & M.L.Goodnight, 1948
 Romerella catharina C.J.Goodnight & M.L.Goodnight, 1948
 Romerella brasiliensis C.J.Goodnight & M.L.Goodnight, 1948
 Romerella punctata C.J.Goodnight & M.L.Goodnight, 1943
 Romerella reticulata Roewer, 1953

References

Harvestmen
Harvestman genera